William Yeats (4 February 1951 – December 2013) was an English footballer who made 34 appearances in the Football League playing as a forward for York City and Darlington. He was on the books of Newcastle United without representing them in the league, and went on to play non-league football for North Shields.

References

1951 births
2013 deaths
People from Hebburn
Footballers from Tyne and Wear
English footballers
Association football forwards
Newcastle United F.C. players
York City F.C. players
Darlington F.C. players
North Shields F.C. players
English Football League players